Kordié is a city located in the province of Sanguié in Burkina Faso.

Populated places in the Centre-Ouest Region
Sanguié Province